Aristava (formerly Lukšiakaimis) is a village in Kėdainiai district municipality, in Kaunas County, in central Lithuania. According to the 2011 census, the village had a population of 489 people. There is a big road junction: the A8 highway, the road to Cinkiškiai via Kėdainiai (KK229), the road to Ukmergė (KK145). There is a library, a former school, a stock farm.

History
The Aristava manor of duke Algimantas has been known since 1371 when it was mentioned by Hermann von Wartberge. The former manor had been located in Aristavėlė but the last palace building was transferred to the Museum of Lithuanian Folk Life.

During the Soviet era, Aristava developed as a central settlement of the "Antanas Sniečkus" kolkhoz. A library (since 1947), a culture house (since 1967) has been opened in Aristava. Several "Aristava" settlements (including Lukšiakiemis village) were merged into Aristava kolkhoz village on June 3, 1952.

Demography

Gallery

References

Villages in Kaunas County
Kėdainiai District Municipality